Lucas da Silva de Jesus (born 30 January 1998) is a Brazilian professional footballer who plays as a forward for Avaí.

Career

Early career
Born in Rio de Janeiro, Silva graduated from Flamengo's youth setup. In his youth career he won several important titles such as Copa São Paulo de Futebol Júnior, Campeonato Carioca U20 and Torneio Otávio Pinto Guimarães alongside teammates Vitor Gabriel, Pepê, Hugo Moura, Matheus Dantas, Matheus Thuler and Gabriel Batista.

Flamengo

2018 season
On 18 January 2018, Silva made his professional debut and scored his first senior goal in a 2–0 win against Volta Redonda, in Campeonato Carioca. In April 2018, Silva suffered an ankle injury and returned to play in October in a Brasileiro under-20 match against Vasco da Gama.

2019 season
In the beginning of the season Silva had few opportunities in the team having five appearances in the 2019 Campeonato Carioca. On 14 April Silva played his first continental match, a 6–1 Copa Libertadores win against San José at Maracanã Stadium, replacing Éverton Ribeiro in the 81st minute. On 1 May Silva debuted at Brazilian Série A, he replaced Willian Arão in the 79th minute against Internacional at Beira-Rio Stadium, Flamengo lost 2–1.

Paços de Ferreira
On 22 July 2020 Flamengo signed Silva from Flamengo on a free transfer.

Career statistics

Honours
Flamengo
Copa Libertadores: 2019
Recopa Sudamericana: 2020
Campeonato Brasileiro Série A: 2019
Supercopa do Brasil: 2020
Campeonato Carioca: 2019

References

External links

Flamengo profile

1998 births
Living people
Footballers from Rio de Janeiro (city)
Brazilian footballers
Association football forwards
CR Flamengo footballers
F.C. Paços de Ferreira players
Avaí FC players
Campeonato Brasileiro Série A players
Primeira Liga players
Brazilian expatriate footballers
Brazilian expatriate sportspeople in Portugal
Expatriate footballers in Portugal